Miguel Angel Escotet is a social scientist, education administrator and author, emeritus professor at the University of Texas at Brownsville, of which he was dean of the College of Education. He was also secretary general of Organización de Estados Iberoamericanos and professor at Florida International University. He is since 2014 director general of corporate social responsibility of Abanca. He is also president of Fundación Galicia Obra Social, Afundación, and president of IESIDE, Afundacion's business school.

Early life and education
Escotet was born in León, Spain and spent his childhood and teenage years in Gijón. He started studies of engineering at Universidad Politécnica de Madrid, which he continued at Universidad del Zulia in Venezuela, before graduating in clinical psychology from Universidad Javeriana in Colombia. In the United States, he obtained an M.A. in psychology and higher education management from the University of Texas at Austin and a Ph.D. from the University of Nebraska, specializing in comparative education and cross-cultural psychology.

Academic and professional career
After earning his PhD in 1972, Escotet became associate professor of psychology at Fort Lewis College, which he left in 1974 to become director general and undersecretary at the ministry of education of Venezuela. He left this position in 1976 to become a founder of Universidad Nacional Abierta, Venezuela's open university, in which he was the provost until 1979, while he also was a professor at Universidad Simón Bolívar. In 1981 he joined Florida International University, were he stayed as professor of research and director of a research center until 1983. He left FIU to become secretary general of Organización de Estados Iberoamericanos in Madrid, a position he held for four years (1983-1987). Between 1987 and 1991 Escotet was rector of Universidad Iberoamericana de Posgrado in Salamanca, after which he became special advisor in higher education and research to the secretary general of UNESCO in Paris. In 1993, Escotet returned to Florida International University, where he was director of the International Institute of Development Education and was appointed Frost professor in 2001. He left FIU in 2004 to become dean of graduate studies at Universidad de Deusto, a private Jesuit university in Spain for four years. Escotet also held the UNESCO Mobile Chair in University History and Future created in 1997 at United Nations University and Universidad de Palermo. In 2008, Escotet joined the University of Texas at Brownsville, where he was dean of the College of Education and from which he retired as emeritus professor in 2014.

Miguel A. Escotet served as a member of UNESCO's advisory committee for higher education in Latin America and the Caribbean for fifteen years. He was also a consultant to the World Bank, Inter-American Development Bank, United Nations Development Program, OECD, European Union, Organization of American States, USAID, UNESCO, as well as many academic institutions in different countries. He was also member of the boards of different academic and professional organizations, and member of the editorial boards of international academic journals and book series.

Awards and distinctions
Escotet received an honorary doctorate from Universidade Federal do Maranhao in Brazil and a number of other awards and international distinctions for his scientific contribution in Europe, the United States and Latin America. He is a Life Status Member of the American Psychological Association (APA).

Selected works 
Escotet is the author of a large number of publications, which have focused mostly on higher education reforms and innovation in Latin America and Europe, and on the development of research methodology in cross-cultural psychology and transnational studies.

References

External links

Fundación Galicia Obra Social, Afundación
Intercontinental Higher Education Institute of Business (IESIDE)
The Escotet Foundation
International Institute of Development
American Psychological Association (APA) - Membership
Miguel Angel Escotet on Twitter

Year of birth missing (living people)
Living people
University of Nebraska–Lincoln alumni
Florida International University faculty
University of Texas at Austin alumni
University of Texas at Austin faculty